Mountain Ridge is an unincorporated community in Cherokee County, Georgia, United States.

References

Unincorporated communities in Georgia (U.S. state)